Markéta Jeřábková (born 8 February 1996) is a Czech handballer for Vipers Kristiansand and the Czech national team. Her brother is Czech international and Stanley Cup winner hockey player Jakub Jeřábek.

She participated at the 2018 European Women's Handball Championship.

Achievements
EHF Champions League:
 Winner: 2021/2022
Czech First Division:
Winner: 2015, 2016, 2017
Norwegian League:
Winner: 2021/2022
Norwegian Cup:
Winner: 2021, 2022/23

Individual awards
MVP
 MVP of the EHF Champions League Final Four: 2022

References

External links

1996 births
Living people
Sportspeople from Plzeň
Czech female handball players
Expatriate handball players
Czech expatriate sportspeople in Germany
Czech expatriate sportspeople in Hungary